Timofey Vladimirovich Kalistratov (born 18 February 2003) is a Russian football player. He plays for FC Dynamo St. Petersburg.

Club career
He made his debut in the Russian Premier League for FC Rostov on 19 June 2020 in a game against PFC Sochi, as a starter. FC Rostov was forced to field their Under-18 squad in that game as their main squad was quarantined after 6 players tested positive for COVID-19.

On 22 February 2022, Kalistratov was loaned to FC Dynamo Saint Petersburg.

References

External links
 
 
 

2003 births
Living people
Russian footballers
Association football defenders
Association football midfielders
FC Rostov players
FC Dynamo Saint Petersburg players
Russian Premier League players
Russian Second League players